The 1926 New South Wales Rugby Football League premiership was the nineteenth season of Sydney’s top-level rugby league club competition, Australia’s first. Nine teams from across the city contested during the season, which culminated in South Sydney’s victory over Sydney University in the premiership final.

Season summary
Rugby league had been going through a period of declining popularity. The “first past the post” method had resulted in a number of seasons where the premiership was decided before the end of scheduled matches, killing interest during the closing rounds. Falling crowd numbers led to the NSWRFL making a substantial loss in 1925, forcing changes to be made. For the 1926 season a finals series was introduced to maintain interest in the competition. The Premiership would therefore be determined amongst the leading four teams.

The rules concerning the play-the-ball were also changed. Only two players could play at the ball, with one player from each side being allowed to stand immediately behind, and all other players having to stay behind that second man until the ball was heeled. Previously any number of players could play at the ball, and by 1925 play-the-balls had become a real mess.

The rules were changed so that when a ball was forced in goal by the defending side play restarted with a line drop-out rather than a scrum.

These changes combined with the use of multiple reserve balls turned rugby league into a faster and much more attractive spectacle, and the fans returned.

Teams
 Balmain, formed on January 23, 1908, at Balmain Town Hall
 Eastern Suburbs, formed on January 24, 1908, at Paddington Town Hall
 Glebe, formed on January 9, 1908
 Newtown, formed on January 14, 1908
 North Sydney, formed on February 7, 1908
 South Sydney, formed on January 17, 1908, at Redfern Town Hall
 St. George, formed on November 8, 1920, at Kogarah School of Arts
 Western Suburbs, formed on February 4, 1908
 University, formed in 1919 at Sydney University

Ladder

Finals
At one stage in the second half of the season, University had been sitting just one win behind reigning premiers South Sydney. But five successive losses at the back end of the season saw them fall to fourth on the ladder. This though was enough to secure their only ever finals berth in their eighteen-year history. South Sydney for the second season straight showed consistent good form, and in the end comfortably won the minor premiership.

In the semi-finals, both University and South Sydney comfortably defeated their opponents to progress to the final.

Final

The 1926 season was the most successful of the eighteen seasons between the wars in which University competed in the top Sydney grade. This may have had to do with their coach Bill Kelly or their new trainer, the former Kangaroo Sid Pearce. Or perhaps they benefitted from that season’s play-the-ball rule change which initially resulted in a cleaner and faster game that suited the lighter and quicker Students. Whatever the reason they won their first seven games.

However the loss of their centre Frank O'Rourke to a broken hand, saw them slip in the final rounds to finish fourth. The play-off system and South Sydney’s “right-of-challenge” as minor-premiers required University to beat the powerful Glebe side and then South Sydney twice to take the title.

In the semi-final against Glebe, University regained their early season form and trounced Glebe by 29–3.

O'Rourke returned for the Final and lined up with state representatives Hubert “Butt” Finn, Jim McIntyre and Alby Lane in front of 20,000 at the Royal Agricultural Society Grounds.

In the opening twenty minutes University had three opportunities to score but poor finishing let them down. After withstanding the Students’ attack Souths responded with eleven points of their own by the half-time break. Early in the second half University’s  McCormack hit back with an intercept try to pull the deficit back to 11–5 however the Rabbitohs defence held for the remainder of the game and they claimed the premiership.

Referee Webby Neill, himself a former premiership winning Rabbitoh, sent off Souths’ Edward Root during the match.

South Sydney 11 (Tries: Brogan, Finch, Watson. Goal: Blair)

University 5 (Tries: Paddy McCormack. Goal: Jim McIntyre)

References

External links
 Rugby League Tables - Notes AFL Tables
 Rugby League Tables - Season 1926 AFL Tables
 Premiership History and Statistics RL1908
 History - Introduction North Sydney Bears
  History of the University Club Sean Fagan's RL1908
 Results: 1921-30 at rabbitohs.com.au

New South Wales Rugby League premiership
NSWRFL season